A Star Is Born is a 2018 American musical romantic drama film produced and directed by Bradley Cooper (in his directorial debut) and written by Eric Roth, Cooper and Will Fetters. A remake of the 1937 film of the same name, it stars Cooper, Lady Gaga, Andrew Dice Clay, Dave Chappelle, and Sam Elliott, and follows a hard-drinking musician (Cooper) who discovers and falls in love with a young singer (Gaga). It marks the fourth remake of the original 1937 film, after the 1954 musical, the 1976 musical and the 2013 Bollywood romance film.

A Star Is Born grossed a worldwide total of over $436 million on a production budget of $36 million. On review aggregator Rotten Tomatoes, the film holds an approval rating of 90% based on 534 reviews, with an average rating of 8/10. The website's critical consensus reads, "With appealing leads, deft direction, and an affecting love story, A Star Is Born is a remake done right—and a reminder that some stories can be just as effective in the retelling." On Metacritic, the film has a weighted average score of 88 out of 100, based on 60 critics, indicating "universal acclaim". Audiences polled by CinemaScore gave the film an average grade of "A" on an A+ to F scale, while PostTrak reported film-goers gave it a 90% positive score.

The film has received numerous awards and nominations, recognizing Cooper's, Gaga's and Elliott's performances and Cooper's direction, as well as the screenplay, cinematography and its soundtrack. Both the American Film Institute and National Board of Review chose it as one of their top ten best films of 2018. The film also won three more accolades from the National Board of Review, including Best Director (Cooper), Best Actress (Gaga) and Best Supporting Actor (Elliott). At the 91st Academy Awards, A Star is Born received eight nominations, including Best Picture, winning Best Original Song for "Shallow", as well as five nominations at the 76th Golden Globe Awards, including Best Motion Picture – Drama, also winning Best Original Song for "Shallow". At the 24th Critics' Choice Movie Awards, Gaga won the categories of Best Actress and Best Song for "Shallow". A Star Is Born also received seven nominations at the 72nd British Academy Film Awards, five of them in different categories for Cooper, which made him the second most nominated person in a single edition in the awards' history. For her contribution on the soundtrack for A Star Is Born, including "Shallow", Gaga became the first woman in history to win an Academy Award, Grammy Award, BAFTA Award, and Golden Globe Award in one single year.

Accolades

See also 
 2018 in film
 2018 in music
 Bradley Cooper awards and nominations
 Lady Gaga awards and nominations

Notes

References

External links 
 

Bradley Cooper
Lady Gaga
Star Is Born